The BYU Cougars men's basketball team represents Brigham Young University in NCAA Division I basketball play. Established in 1902, the team has won 27 conference championships, 3 conference tournament championships and 2 NIT Tournaments (1951 and 1966), and competed in 29 NCAA tournaments. It currently competes in the West Coast Conference. From 1999–2011, the team competed in the Mountain West Conference. On September 10, 2021, the Big 12 Conference unanimously accepted BYU's application to the conference, joining for the 2023–24 season.

History
BYU fielded its first basketball team in 1903. In 1906, the Cougars played their first game against Utah State University. In 1909, the team first played against the University of Utah. These two rivalries continue to this day. In its 108-year history, BYU's basketball program has won 1,786 games, ranking 12th among all Division I programs. The Cougars won the first of their 27 conference championships in 1922 as a member of the Rocky Mountain Athletic Conference led by star point guard River Jeffcoat.

The Cougars made the first of their 29 NCAA tournament appearances in 1950 under head coach Stan Watts. That Cougars came within one point of reaching the national semifinals. BYU's 1951 team was even more successful, winning 28 games and once again qualifying for the NCAA tournament.  In addition, the 1951 team won the first of two NIT championships for the school. The Cougars defeated AP No. 9 St. John's, AP #10 St. Louis and AP #13 Dayton to win the title. Notable players on that team include: Mel Hutchins, who was taken #2 in the 1951 NBA draft, was named the 1951–52 NBA co-rookie of the year and became a 5-time NBA All-Star with the Pistons and the Knicks; Roland Minson, who was drafted #16 overall in the 1951 NBA draft; and Loren C. Dunn, a future general authority in the Church of Jesus Christ of Latter-day Saints. The Cougars would go on to make five more appearances in the NCAA tournament under Watts, and win their second NIT championship in 1966, although by that time the overall prestige of the NIT had fallen considerably. BYU has the most NCAA appearances of any men's team not to make the Final Four, having made thirty NCAA tournaments. BYU, alongside Xavier, Saint Joseph's, Boston College, Arizona State, and Davidson are each tied for second most in Elite Eight appearances without a Final Four with three (Missouri has the most with five). 

Under Watts, BYU also became the first U.S. college basketball program to include an international player on its roster, as Finland native Timo Lampen debuted in the 1958–59 season. Later, BYU's Krešimir Ćosić, born in Yugoslavia (modern-day Croatia), became the first international player to be named an All-American. His jersey was retired in the Marriott Center in March 2006 in the last home game of the season against the New Mexico Lobos. Watts retired as the winningest coach in BYU history.

After Watts' retirement following the 1972 season, the program experienced five consecutive losing seasons from 1974 through 1978 before returning to the NCAA tournament in 1979 behind Danny Ainge and coach Frank Arnold. The Cougars reached the Elite Eight, one game short of the Final Four, in 1981, Ainge's senior season. That season, Ainge won the Wooden Award as the nation's most outstanding player.

Arnold left following the 1983 season and was replaced by LaDell Andersen, who had several successful seasons in the 1980s, including the 1987–88 season when the Cougars rose as high as #3 in the national rankings on their way to a 26–6 season. Andersen then resigned following a 14–15 season in 1989. He was replaced by Roger Reid, who guided the Cougars to 20-win seasons in each of his first six years and five NCAA tournament appearances.

Reid was fired in the middle of the 1996–97 season after a 1–6 start. Part of his firing had to do with a private comment Reid made to Chris Burgess, then considered the top high school player in the nation and a Latter-day Saint whose father had attended BYU; Reid suggested that Burgess had let down the entire church by choosing to attend Duke rather than BYU. Assistant coach Tony Ingle coached the team on an interim basis for the rest of the season and did not win a game; the Cougars' 1–25 record was the first time the school failed to reach 5 wins in a season.

Following the season, Steve Cleveland was hired as the new head coach and returned the Cougars to prominence. In 2001, the Cougars won the MWC regular season and tournament championships, making their first NCAA tournament appearance since 1995. After the 2004–05 season, Cleveland resigned to become the head coach at Fresno State; he was replaced by Dave Rose.

Dave Rose, co-captain of the University of Houston's 1983 "Phi Slama Jama" college basketball team, began the first of six straight 20-win seasons in 2005–06. Rose and assistant Dave Rice continued BYU's successful recruiting with the addition of All-American Jimmer Fredette in 2007 and DeMarcus Harrison in 2011. In June 2009, he was diagnosed with pancreatic cancer and returned to coaching later that year. In 2010, Rose coached BYU to their first NCAA tournament victory in 17 years in a double-overtime win against the University of Florida. The following year, BYU made further inroads as a #3 seed when they advanced to the Sweet 16. On March 13, 2012, BYU set a record for the largest comeback in an NCAA tournament game, as they were down by 25 points at one point in their first game of the 2012 NCAA Division I men's basketball tournament and came back to beat the Iona Gaels 78–72.

Following Tyler Haws' departure for an overseas professional career, Kyle Collinsworth became the Cougars' recognized leader, setting the NCAA record for career triple doubles and earning WCC Player of the Year honors as a senior. Since Collinsworth's departure, the Cougars have struggled, especially in the postseason. The program was dealt an additional blow when the NCAA announced penalties against the Cougars due to an alleged benefits scandal surrounding shooting guard Nick Emery. As part of those sanctions, BYU was ordered to vacate all victories where Nick Emery played over two seasons (a total of 47 wins).  The BYU athletics department has appealed the decision.  An official BYU athletics department statement (not attributed to a specific employee) read in part, “The vacation-of-records penalty is extremely harsh and unprecedented given the details of the case. For more than two decades, the NCAA has not required an institution to vacate games in similar cases where the COI found there was no institutional knowledge of or involvement in the violation by either the coaching staff or other university personnel. In fact, this sanction includes the most severe vacation-of-record penalty ever imposed in the history of NCAA Division I basketball for infractions that included no institutional knowledge or involvement. In addition, in the case most similar to this situation, appropriate penalties were imposed, but no wins were vacated. BYU believes the vacating of its game record penalty is unfair and not consistent with recent NCAA precedent.”

On March 26, 2019, after thirteen seasons as head coach at BYU, Dave Rose announced his retirement. On April 10, 2019, BYU athletics director Tom Holmoe announced that Mark Pope, a former assistant at BYU under Rose and head coach of the Utah Valley University men's basketball team, had been hired as Rose's replacement.

On July 23, 2019, Nick Emery announced that he was retiring from college basketball. He cited unspecified challenges in his career that led to the decision.

Pope led a turnaround for the program in his first two seasons, with his inaugural season led by a trio of seniors in Yoeli Childs, T.J. Haws (younger brother of Tyler), and Jake Toolson. The team finished that season 24–8 and was projected to be a lock for the NCAA tournament as a single-digit seed before all postseason play was cancelled due to the COVID-19 pandemic. The 2020–21 season was projected to be a rebuilding year due to the loss of Childs, Haws, and Toolson to graduation, but Pope revamped the team in the offseason. Joining returning senior guard Alex Barcello was graduate transfers Brandon Averette and Matt Haarms. The 2020–21 team finished the regular season 20–6 and made the NCAA tournament as a No. 6 seed, the first appearance in the tournament since the 2014–15 season.

Coaches

Season-by-season results

Under Mark Pope:

WCC Tournament results

Postseason

NCAA tournament
BYU has made the NCAA tournament thirty times, with the Cougars having a record of 15–33.

NIT
BYU has made the National Invitation Tournament fifteen times, going 19–13. The Cougars were champions in 1951 and 1966.

NAIA Tournament
BYU made two appearances in the NAIA Tournament, going 2–2.

Individual honors

Retired numbers

The Cougars have retired the numbers of four players in their history, with the most recent being the jerseys of Hutchins and Minson on February 16, 2013.

National Players of the Year
Danny Ainge (1981)
Jimmer Fredette (2011)

All-Americans
Elwood Romney (1931–32)
Mel Hutchins (1951)
Roland Minson (1951)
Joe Richey (1953)
John Fairchild (1965)
Dick Nemelka (1966)
Krešimir Ćosić (1972–73)
Danny Ainge (1980–81)
Devin Durrant (1984)
Michael Smith (1988)
Jimmer Fredette (2010–11)

Conference Players of the Year
John Fairchild (1965)
Danny Ainge (1981)
Devin Durrant (1983)
Timo Saarelainen (1985)
Michael Smith (1988)
Mekeli Wesley (2001)
Rafael Araújo (2004)
Keena Young (2007)
Lee Cummard (2008)
Jimmer Fredette (2011)
Tyler Haws (2014)
Kyle Collinsworth (2015)

Individual records

Points scored, single game: 52, Jimmer Fredette, March 11, 2011 vs. New Mexico
Points scored, season: 1,068, Jimmer Fredette, 2010–11
Points scored, career: 2,720, Tyler Haws, 2009–10, 2012–15
Field goals made, single game: 22, Jimmer Fredette, March 11, 2011 vs. New Mexico
Field goals made, season: 346, Jimmer Fredette, 2010–11
Field goals made, career: 987, Danny Ainge, 1978–81
Three-point field goals made, single game: 10, Chase Fischer, November 25, 2014 vs. Chaminade; and Nick Emery, February 11, 2016 vs. San Francisco
Three-point field goals made, season: 124, Jimmer Fredette, 2010–11
Three-point field goals made, career: 296, Jimmer Fredette, 2007–11
Consecutive games with a Three-point field goal made: 31, Nick Emery
Free throws made, single game: 23, Jimmer Fredette, March 11, 2010 vs. TCU
Free throws made, season: 252, Jimmer Fredette, 2010–11
Free throws made, career: 724, Tyler Haws, 2009–10, 2012–15
Rebounds, single game: 27, Scott Warner, December 18, 1969 vs. Texas Tech
Rebounds, season: 471, Mel Hutchins, 1950–51
Rebounds, career: 1,053, Yoeli Childs, 2016–20
Assists, single game: 16, Mike May, December 11, 1976 vs. Niagara
Assists, season: 275, Kyle Collinsworth, 2015–16
Assists, career: 703, Kyle Collinsworth, 2010–11, 2013–16
Steals, single game: 9, Mark Bigelow, November 28, 1998 vs. Arizona
Steals, season: 101, Jackson Emery, 2010–11
Steals, career: 249, Jackson Emery, 2005–06, 2008–11
Blocked shots, single game: 14, Shawn Bradley, December 7, 1990 vs. Eastern Kentucky
Blocked shots, season: 177, Shawn Bradley, 1990–91
Blocked shots, career: 208, Greg Kite, 1979–83

Notable players

References

External links